Archaeophya magnifica is a species of dragonfly in the family Gomphomacromiidae,
known as the magnificent urfly. 
It is a large, metallic-black dragonfly with yellow markings and clear wings.
It is endemic to north-east Queensland, Australia.
where it inhabits rainforest streams.

Gallery

Note
There is uncertainty about which family Archaeophya magnifica best belongs to: Gomphomacromiidae, Synthemistidae, or Corduliidae.

See also
 List of Odonata species of Australia

References

Gomphomacromiidae
Odonata of Australia
Endemic fauna of Australia
Taxa named by Günther Theischinger
Taxa named by J.A.L. (Tony) Watson
Insects described in 1978